Anna Mjöll Ólafsdóttir is an Icelandic jazz singer and songwriter.

Early years 
Anna was born in Reykjavík, Iceland, the daughter of Svanhildur Jakobsdóttir, singer and TV and Radio Personality, and Ólafur Gaukur, Jazz guitarist, Film Composer, songwriter, arranger and Producer. Anna's only sibling, Andri, is a General Surgeon in Arizona. Anna's parents played six nights a week in her early years. They toured every summer bringing in dancers, fire eaters and magicians from England. Anna began studying guitar herself at the age of six, followed by piano and cello. She wrote and performed her first song when she was eight. In high school she performed jazz numbers on her cello and at 18 she started singing professionally in local restaurants. Anna obtained a college degree from Menntaskólinn í Reykjavík and studied at Sorbonne in Paris, France before going to Los Angeles to play jazz.

Personal life 

Anna and American musician, songwriter, producer Patrick Leonard were married on 19 November 2018, in Patrick's home town, Crystal Falls, Michigan, United States.

Mjoll is a licensed Private Pilot with an Instrument rating.

Career 
Anna performed extensively on Icelandic television early on.  She represented Iceland at Eurovision Song Contest 1996 with the song "Sjúbídú", which she co-wrote with her father.

In the lyrics she sings about some of her idols including Ella Fitzgerald, Frank Sinatra, Elvis Presley, Sammy Davis Jr. and Dizzy Gillespie. She toured worldwide with the singer Julio Iglesias for three years. In 2006, she co-wrote and performed three songs with C.J. Vanston for the film For Your Consideration.

In 2009, Anna released her first album, The Shadow Of Your Smile, containing a mix of Icelandic songs and jazz standards. The CD included a number of notable musicians including Vinnie Colaiuta, Dave Carpenter, Don Grusin, Neil Stubenhaus, and Luis Conte, and was voted one of the top 5 female vocal jazz CDs of 2009 at Arnaldo DeSouteiro's Jazz Station. In 2009, Anna was voted one of the top 5 jazz singers of the year by DeSouteiro's Jazz Station.

In 2010 Anna released her second album, Christmas Jazzmaz.

See also 

 List of Icelandic writers
 Culture of Iceland

References

External links
 Arnaldo DeSouteiro's Jazz Station on Anna Mjöll
 Christmas Jazzmaz 2010 - Arnaldo DeSouteiro's Jazz Station - Best Jazz of 2010

1970 births
Living people
Anna Mjoll
Anna Mjoll
Anna Mjoll
Anna Mjoll
21st-century Icelandic women singers
Eurovision Song Contest entrants of 1996
Eurovision Song Contest entrants for Iceland